
Gmina Gniezno is a rural gmina (administrative district) in Gniezno County, Greater Poland Voivodeship, in west-central Poland. Its seat is the town of Gniezno, although the town is not part of the territory of the gmina.

Villages
Gmina Gniezno contains the villages and settlements of Braciszewo, Dalki, Dębówiec, Ganina, Goślinowo, Jankowo Dolne, Kalina, Krzyszczewo, Łabiszynek, Lubochnia, Lulkowo, Mączniki, Mnichowo, Modliszewko, Modliszewo, Napoleonowo, Obora, Obórka, Osiniec, Piekary, Pyszczyn, Pyszczynek, Skiereszewo, Strzyżewo Kościelne, Strzyżewo Paczkowe, Strzyżewo Smykowe, Szczytniki Duchowne, Wełnica, Wierzbiczany, Wola Skorzęcka and Zdziechowa.

Neighbouring gminas
Gmina Gniezno is bordered by the town of Gniezno and by the gminas of Czerniejewo, Kłecko, Łubowo, Mieleszyn, Niechanowo, Rogowo, Trzemeszno and Witkowo.

References
Polish official population figures 2006

Gniezno
Gniezno County